Per Mårtensson (born 1967 in Östersund) is a Swedish composer and teacher. He is artistic director and teaches composition at The Gotland School of Music Composition. In 1998 he was given membership in The Society of Swedish Composers. Mårtenssons catalog contains mainly orchestral and chamber music. He has composed music for ensembles such as Norrbotten NEO, Sonanza and Pearls Before Swine Experience. His flute concerto was awarded the Christ Johnson-price prize—the most prestigious composition price in Sweden.

Discography 
 Flauto con forza, PSCD 173
 the peärls before swïne experience, Caprice Records CAP21587. 1998
 String Qt 1 'Sediments of Discourse' [PhonoSuecia] PSCD 182.  2007-8
 Stenhammar Qt 'Quartetto con Forza'

Sources
 Composer biography at Swedish Music

Contemporary classical music in Sweden
1967 births
Living people